Group 1 of the 1966 FIFA World Cup consisted of Uruguay, hosts England, France, and Mexico. Play began on 11 July 1966 and concluded on 20 July 1966. England won the group and Uruguay finished as runners-up, and both advanced to the quarter-finals. Mexico and France failed to advance. England went on to win the tournament.

Standings

Matches

England vs Uruguay

France vs Mexico

Uruguay vs France

England vs Mexico

Mexico vs Uruguay

England vs France

References

External links
 1966 FIFA World Cup archive

1966 FIFA World Cup
France at the 1966 FIFA World Cup
England at the 1966 FIFA World Cup
Mexico at the 1966 FIFA World Cup
Uruguay at the 1966 FIFA World Cup